The Life Acoustic is an album by American musician Everlast, composed of re-recordings of his previous songs performed on acoustic guitar. It was released on August 27, 2013 via Martyr Inc Records/EMI. Recording sessions took place at Martyr Inc Studios. Production was handled by Evelast himself with co-producer Joe Reiver, additional producer Bryan Velasco and co-executive producers Ivory Daniel and Kevin Zinger. The album peaked at number 102 on the US Billboard 200, number 67 on the Swiss Hitparade and number 98 on the GfK Entertainment charts.

Track listing

Personnel
Erik "Everlast" Schrody — vocals, guitar, producer, executive producer
Derek Brassel — additional guitar
Bryan Velasco — keyboards and additional producer (track 12)
Joe Reiver — co-producer, recording, mixing
Ivory Daniel — co-executive producer, management
Kevin Zinger — co-executive producer, management
Gavin Lurssen — mastering
Reuben Cohen — mastering
Tristan Eaton — artwork
Alex Rauch — layout

Charts

References

External links

2013 albums
Everlast (musician) albums